is a 2004 Japanese film directed by Yasuo Furuhata. It is set in Manchukuo during World War II.

Accolades 
28th Japan Academy Prize
Nominated: Best Actress - Takako Tokiwa
Nominated: Best Supporting Actor - Teruyuki Kagawa

References

2004 films
Films directed by Yasuo Furuhata
Japanese historical drama films
Japanese World War II films
2000s Japanese-language films
Films set in Manchukuo
Films set in the 1940s
2000s Japanese films